Maung Tin Oo is a five-time Myanmar Academy Award-winning Burmese film director.

Early life and education 
He was born on 21 March 1942 in Mandalay. His father is Thakin Thein Pe and his mother is Daw Mya Mya from Mandalay. He is the eldest of three siblings. His younger siblings included Zaw One, a Burmese actor and singer, and Swe Swe.

He studied a basic education at his mother's Taingchit High School. He studied up to 10th grade.

Careers

He entered the film industry in 1964-65. In 1968, he studied under U Kyaw. He co-directed with U Kyaw in the film Say Lo Ya Say. The first directed film was Nay Htwet Thaw Nya (နေထွက်သောည).

Awards and nominations

Personal life
He was married to Daw Tin Tin Aye. They have three daughters, including Mee Mee Tin Oo.

Death
At the age of 74, he died at his home in Mandalay on 2015.

References

Burmese film directors
Burmese film producers
People from Mandalay
1942 births
Living people